John Stephen Bailey (born 30 July 1950) is an English former professional footballer who played as a wing half in the Football League for Swindon Town and in non-league football for Cheltenham Town. He has been chairman of Didcot Town Football Club since 1995.

References

1950 births
Living people
English footballers
Association football wing halves
Swindon Town F.C. players
Cheltenham Town F.C. players
English football chairmen and investors